Jody Gilbert (March 18, 1916 – February 3, 1979) was an American actress.

Biography
Gilbert was born in Fort Worth, Texas. She studied voice and acting at Columbia University, and was a graduate of Pasadena Playhouse.

One of her first notable roles was in the W.C. Fields film Never Give a Sucker an Even Break, playing a quick-witted diner waitress who has a verbal duel with Fields. She appeared in numerous roles in the movies, radio and television, often in supporting roles as "sizeable" but confident women.

Gilbert died from complications from an auto accident in 1979.

Filmography

References

External links
 
 

1916 births
1979 deaths
20th-century American actresses
American film actresses